Grove is an unincorporated community in Doddridge County, West Virginia, United States. Its post office is closed.

Notable person

 Matthew M. Neely - former Governor of West Virginia

References 

Unincorporated communities in West Virginia
Unincorporated communities in Doddridge County, West Virginia